The racquetball competition at the 2022 World Games took place from July 10 to 13 in Birmingham, Alabama in the United States at the University of Alabama Birmingham.
Originally scheduled to take place in July 2021, the Games were rescheduled for July 2022 as a result of the 2020 Summer Olympics postponement due to the COVID-19 pandemic. Racquetball returns to The World Games programme after nine years of absence.

Schedule
All times are Alabama Time (UTC-5)

Qualification
Sixteen men and sixteen women qualified for the 2022 World Games at the 2021 World Championships in Guatemala City, Guatemala.

Participating nations

Medal table

Events

References

External links
 The World Games 2022
 International Racquetball Federation
 Results book

 
2022 World Games
2022 in racquetball